Âşık Veysel (born Veysel Şatıroğlu; 25 October 1894 – 21 March 1973) was a Turkish Alevi ashik and highly regarded poet of the Turkish folk literature. He was born in the Sivrialan village of the Şarkışla district, in the province of Sivas. He was an ashik, poet, songwriter, and a bağlama virtuoso, the prominent representative of the Anatolian ashik tradition in the 20th century. He was blind for most of his lifetime. His songs are usually sad tunes, often dealing with the inevitability of death. However, Veysel used a wide range of themes for his lyrics; based on morals, values, and constant questioning of issues such as love, care, beliefs, and how he perceived the world as a blind man.

Biography

Early life 
Smallpox was prevalent throughout the Ottoman region that included Sivas in the late 19th and early 20th centuries. His mother Gülizar and his farmer father Karaca Ahmet had already lost two daughters to smallpox before Veysel was born. He is the fifth of their six children. When Veysel turned seven in 1901, another smallpox outbreak occurred in Sivas, and Veysel contracted the disease as well. He became blind in his left eye and a cataract developed in his right eye. After an accident, his right eye was blinded as well. His father gave his blind son a bağlama and recited many folk poems to him. Poets of the region also started to drop by Ahmet Şatıroğlu's house as well with their friends. They played instruments and sang songs. Veysel used to listen to them carefully.

Veysel, the child bağlama player 
Veysel devoted himself wholeheartedly to playing bağlama and singing. He was first instructed by his father's friend, Çamışıhlı Ali Aga (Âşık Alâ), who taught him about the works of Pir Sultan Abdal, Karacaoğlan, Dertli, Rühsati and other great Alevi poets and ashiks of Anatolia.

World War I and after 
Veysel was 20 when the First World War started. All of his friends and his brother rushed to the front, but because of his blindness he was left alone with his bağlama.

After the war, he married a woman named Esma, who bore him a daughter and a son. The son died 10 days after birth. On 24 February 1921 Veysel's mother died, followed eighteen months later by his father. By then Esma had left him and their six-month-old daughter, running off with a servant from his brother's house. His daughter also died at a young age.

1930s 
He met Ahmet Kutsi Tecer, a literature teacher in Sivas High School, who along with his colleagues founded the Association For Preservation of Folk Poets in 1931. On 5 December 1931 they organized  the Fest of Folk Poets, which lasted for three days. Veysel's meeting with Ahmet Kutsi Tecer thus marked a turning point in his life.

Until 1933, Veysel played and sang the poems of master ozans. In the tenth anniversary of the Republic, upon the directives of Ahmet Kutsi Tecer, all folk poets wrote poems about the Republic and Mustafa Kemal. Veysel submitted a poem starting with the line "Atatürk is the revival of Turkey...". This poem came into daylight only after Veysel left his village.

Ali Rıza Bey, the mayor of Ağcakışla to which Sivrialan was then affiliated, had much appreciation for Veysel's poem and wanted to send it to Ankara. Veysel said he would like to go to visit the nation's leader, Mustafa Kemal Atatürk, and traveled to Ankara on foot with his faithful friend İbrahim under tough winter conditions. They arrived in Ankara three months later. Veysel resided with his hospitable friends for forty five days in Ankara. Sadly, he was unable to present his poem to Atatürk. His mother Gülizar said that "He felt bitter regret for two things in life: first not having been able to visit the great leader, and second, not being able to join the army…". However, his poem was printed in a printing house named Hakimiyeti Milliye in Ulus, and was published in the newspaper for three days. Then, he started to travel around the country to perform his poems.

Veysel said the following about this time in his life:

Teacher of the Village Institutes 
Upon the establishment of the Village Institutes, an initiative from Ahmet Kutsi Tecer, Âşık Veysel worked as a bağlama teacher in the Village Institutes of Arifiye, Hasanoğlan, Çifteler, Kastamonu, Yıldızeli and Akpınar.

Later life and legacy 
In 1965, the Turkish Grand National Assembly resolved upon allocating a monthly salary in 500 TL to Âşık Veysel in return for “his contribution to our native language and national solidarity.” On 21 March 1973 at 3:30 am, Veysel died of lung cancer in Sivrialan, the village he was born in, in a house that now serves as a museum.

In 2000, a compilation album of Âşık Veysel's songs named Âşık Veysel Klasikleri was released. In 2008, Joe Satriani's album Professor Satchafunkilus and the Musterion of Rock featured two songs called Âşık Veysel and Andalusia, which were dedicated to Âşık Veysel. In the same year, a remixed version of Âşık Veysel's song Uzun İnce Bir Yoldayım was featured as the main theme in a Turkish film series, Gece Gündüz.

In 2022, the Paris Institute for Critical Thinking (PICT) commenced a project to translate Âşık Veysel's poems into English; so far, 3 poems have been published online, all translated by David Selim Sayers and Evrim Emir-Sayers.

Uzun İnce Bir Yoldayım (lyrics) 

"Uzun İnce Bir Yoldayım" (English: "I'm on a Long and Narrow Road"; translation by David Selim Sayers and Evrim Emir-Sayers) is one of Veysel's best known works and is still popular among fans of Turkish folk music.

Selected works 

 Anlatamam derdimi (5:24)
 Arasam seni gül ilen (4:18)
 Atatürk'e ağıt (5:21)
 Beni hor görme (2:46)
 Beş günlük Dünya (3:58)
 Bir kökte uzamış (4:55)
 Birlik destani (1:42)
 Çiçekler (3:05)
 Cümle âlem senindir (6:44)
 Derdimi dökersem derin dereye (4:51)
 Dost çevirmiş yüzünü benden (3:12)
 Dost yolunda (4:43)
 Dostlar beni hatırlasın (6:02)
 Dün gece yar eşiğinde (4:28)
 Dünya'ya gelmemde maksat (2:43)
 Esti bahar yeli (2:41)
 Gel ey âşık (5:35)
 Gonca gülün kokusuna (5:24)
 Gönül sana nasihatim (6:40)
 Gözyaşı armağan (3:32)
 Güzelliğin on para etmez (4:31)
 Kahpe felek (2:58)
 Kara toprak (9:25)
 Kızılırmak seni seni (4:58)
 Küçük dünyam (5:17)
 Murat (5:13)
 Ne ötersin dertli dertli (3:05)
 Necip (3:16)
 Sazım (6:02)
 Seherin vaktinde (5:01)
 Sekizinci ayın yirmi ikisi (4:43)
 Sen varsın (4:01)
 Şu geniş Dünya'ya (7:27)
 Uzun ince bir yoldayım (2:23)
 Yaz gelsin (3:02)
 Yıldız (Sivas ellerinde) (3:16)

See also 
 Turkish folk literature
 Turkish language
 Aşık Veysel Meslek Yüksekokulu

References

Sources

External links
  Âşık Veysel's village
  A biography
  Âşık Veysel: Biography and Discography with Samples
  Sivrialan village is Âşık Veysel's hometown
  Âşık Veysel's poems

1894 births
1973 deaths
People from Şarkışla
People from Sivas vilayet
Blind musicians
Blind writers
Turkish folk poets
20th-century Turkish male singers
Turkish Alevis
Composers of Ottoman classical music
Composers of Turkish makam music
Turkish blind people
Ashiks
Deaths from lung cancer in Turkey